The 1993 Bud 500 was the 21st stock car race of the 1993 NASCAR Winston Cup Series season and the 33rd iteration of the event. The race was held on Saturday, August 28, 1993, before a crowd of 72,500 in Bristol, Tennessee at Bristol Motor Speedway, a 0.533 miles (0.858 km) permanent oval-shaped racetrack. The race took the scheduled 500 laps to complete. In the closing laps of the race, Roush Racing driver Mark Martin would manage to make a late-race charge on the dominant Penske Racing South driver Rusty Wallace, passing him for the lead with 13 to go, completing a comeback victory from two laps down earlier in the race. The victory was Martin's tenth career NASCAR Winston Cup Series victory, his third victory of the season, and his third consecutive victory. To fill out the top three, the aforementioned Wallace and Richard Childress Racing driver Dale Earnhardt would finish second and third, respectively.

Background 

The Bristol Motor Speedway, formerly known as Bristol International Raceway and Bristol Raceway, is a NASCAR short track venue located in Bristol, Tennessee. Constructed in 1960, it held its first NASCAR race on July 30, 1961. Despite its short length, Bristol is among the most popular tracks on the NASCAR schedule because of its distinct features, which include extraordinarily steep banking, an all concrete surface, two pit roads, and stadium-like seating. It has also been named one of the loudest NASCAR tracks.

Entry list 

 (R) denotes rookie driver.

Qualifying 
Qualifying was originally scheduled to be split into two rounds. The first round was scheduled to be held on Friday, August 27, at 5:30 PM EST. However, due to rain, the first round was cancelled, and qualifying was condensed into one round, which was held on Saturday, August 28, at 1:30 PM EST. Each driver would have one lap to set a time. For this specific race, positions 1-32 would be decided on time, and depending on who needed it, a select amount of positions were given to cars who had not otherwise qualified but were high enough in owner's points; up to two provisionals were given. If needed, a past champion who did not qualify on either time or provisionals could use a champion's provisional, adding one more spot to the field.

Four drivers would fail to qualify.

Full qualifying results

Race results

Standings after the race 

Drivers' Championship standings

Note: Only the first 10 positions are included for the driver standings.

References 

1993 NASCAR Winston Cup Series
NASCAR races at Bristol Motor Speedway
August 1993 sports events in the United States
1993 in sports in Tennessee